Aphantopus maculosa is a  butterfly found in the Palearctic that belongs to the browns 
family. It is endemic to China.

Description from Seitz

A. maculosa Leech (45 g). Forewing above and beneath with 3 eye -rings; hindwing above with 2, beneath with 5 eye-rings; 
all the ocelli without ocelli above. — Chang-Yang, singly, in July.

References

Satyrinae
Butterflies described in 1890